KUCO may refer to: 

 KUCO (FM), a radio station (90.1 FM) licensed to Edmond, Oklahoma, United States
 KUCO-LD, a television station (channel 27) licensed to Chico, California, United States
 Juraj Kucka, Slovakian soccer player, nicknamed "Kuco"